Gerhard Hahn may refer to:

 Gerhard Hahn (theologist) (1901–1943), German theologist; Spiritual Vice President of the  Evangelical-Lutheran Church of Hanover
 Gerhard Hahn (Germanist) (born 1933), German Germanist and medievalist
 Gerhard Hahn (director) (born 1946), German film director and producer of Asterix Conquers America etc.
 Gerhard Hahn (astronomer), planetary astronomer at Uppsala Observatory, deceased, see 5335 Damocles